Sha is an Afro-Asiatic language spoken in Plateau State and Kaduna State, Nigeria. As of 2018, the language is in use for face-to-face communication and has no standardized written form. The language is spoken by roughly 1000 people and is sustainable.

The main area of Sha is in Sha District, Bokkos LGA, Plateau State. Mundat, a closely related language also belonging to the Chadic A.4 branch, is spoken in Mundat village of the same district.

Notes

West Chadic languages
Languages of Nigeria